Weichang Manchu and Mongol Autonomous County (Mölendroff: weicang manju monggo beye dasangga siyan;) is a Manchu and Mongol autonomous county located in far northeastern Hebei province, China. It lies under the administration of Chengde City, and is the northernmost county of the province, bordering Inner Mongolia to the north.

The area has been historically home to Manchu soldiers, and the local dialect of Mandarin is similar to that of Beijing, though there is some Northeastern influence.

History

The area of the county was originally grazing grounds for Mongol tribes. In the early Qing Dynasty, the Auqan, Kharchin and Onnigud Mongols gave these lands as a gift to the Kangxi Emperor, who then created the Mulan Hunting Grounds in Weichang. Thereafter, it became hunting ground for the Qing royal family， Eight Banners aristocrats and Mongols.

Geography and climate
Weichang is located in the northernmost part of Hebei, with a latitude range of 41° 35' to 42° 40' N and longitude range of 116° 32' to 118° 14' E. It borders Inner Mongolia's Chifeng city to the east, Hexigten Banner to the north, as well as Duolun County to the northwest. Within Hebei province, it borders Fengning County and Longhua County to the southwest and south.

Weichang has a rather dry, monsoon-influenced humid continental climate (Köppen Dwb), with long, very cold and dry winters, and very warm, humid summers, and the elevation depresses temperatures. More than half of the annual precipitation occurs in July and August alone.

Administrative divisions
There are 7 towns and 30 townships in the county.

Towns:
Weichang
Siheyong
Kelegou
Qipanshan
Banjieta
Chaoyangdi
Chaoyangwan

Townships:

References

External links

Manchu autonomous counties
Mongol autonomous counties
County-level divisions of Hebei
Chengde